The Claretian Sisters were founded in 1855 by María Antonia París (1813 - 1885)  and Anthony Mary Claret. As of 2012, they were the third largest Catholic religious institute for women, with around 7,171 members.

History
The Claretian Missionary Sisters were founded in Santiago de Cuba in 1855. In 1850 Sister María Antonia París, met Anthony Mary Claret and told him of her concept of a new religious institute. When Claret was appointed Archbishop of Santiago, he wrote her, inviting her to found her new congregation in Cuba. The new community opened schools for girls. 

The patroness of the institute is Mary, under the title of the Immaculate Conception.

Ministry of the Order
Christian formation of children, young people, and adults 

social services 

Hispanic and migrant ministry 

liturgical ministry 

formation of candidates to the priesthood 

Youth and Vocational Ministry

References

External links
 Claretian Sisters
 

Catholic female orders and societies
Religious organizations established in 1855
Catholic religious institutes established in the 19th century